Oxygen-17 (17O) is a low-abundance, natural, stable isotope of oxygen (0.0373% in seawater; approximately twice as abundant as deuterium).

As the only stable isotope of oxygen possessing a nuclear spin (+5/2) and a favorable characteristic of field-independent relaxation in liquid water, 17O enables NMR studies of oxidative metabolic pathways through compounds containing 17O (i.e. metabolically produced H217O water by oxidative phosphorylation in mitochondria) at high magnetic fields.

Water used as nuclear reactor coolant is subjected to intense neutron flux. Natural water starts out with 373 ppm of 17O; heavy water starts out incidentally enriched to about 550 ppm of oxygen-17. The neutron flux slowly converts 16O in the cooling water to 17O by neutron capture, increasing its concentration.  The neutron flux slowly converts 17O (with much greater cross section) in the cooling water to carbon-14, an undesirable product that can escape to the environment:
 17O (n,α) → 14C
Some tritium removal facilities make a point of replacing the oxygen of the water with natural oxygen (mostly 16O) to give the added benefit of reducing 14C production.

History
The isotope was first hypothesized and subsequently imaged by Patrick Blackett in Rutherford's lab in 1925:

It was a product out of the first man-made transmutation of 14N and 4He2+ conducted by Frederick Soddy and Ernest Rutherford in 1917–1919. Its natural abundance in Earth's atmosphere was later detected in 1929 by Giauque and Johnson in absorption spectra.

References

Environmental isotopes
Isotopes of oxygen